Foiano  may refer to:

 Fiano (grape), white Italian wine grape variety
 Foiano della Chiana, town in eastern Tuscany, in the province of Arezzo
 Foiano di Val Fortore, municipality in the Province of Benevento in the Italian region of Campania

See also 

 Fiano (disambiguation)